John Looney may refer to:

 J. Thomas Looney (1870–1944), originator of the Oxfordian theory regarding the authorship of Shakespeare's plays
 John Patrick Looney (1865–1947), gangster in Rock Island, Illinois during the early 1900s
 John Looney (Cherokee chief) (died 1846)

See also
 John Don Looney (1916–2015), end in the National Football League